Śrī Kalyāṇī Yogāśrama Sansthā, also known as the Galduwa Forest Tradition is an independent part of the Sri Lankan Amarapura–Rāmañña Nikāya Buddhist ordination line, with their headquarters in Galduva, Kahawa, Ambalangoda. They keep a strict standard of Vinaya (commentarial interpretation), recognised as the strictest standard of any major organisation in Sri Lanka. It is the largest forest sect of the Sri Lankan Sangha (Buddhist Monks). Their monks are easily recognized by the palm-leaf umbrella they use and by the habit of wearing the Sanghati (double robe) whenever they walk outside the monastery boundaries. Remarkably for Sri Lanka, all castes are accepted for ordination. Foreign monks, who wish to become resident at one of their monasteries, are usually expected to undergo the so-called "Dalhi-Kamma" at Galduva, a short ceremony meant to reconfirm the validity of their original Upasampada according to Galduva standard. After that they are accepted according to their normal seniority.

History 
The (modern) history of arañña senasana or forest hermitages of Sri Lanka runs back to 1951, when Ven. Kadawedduwe Sri Jinavamsa Mahathera (sometimes spelled Jinawansa) Thera, with the guidance of Matara Sri Nanarama Mahathera, founded the Galduva Aranya, which was to become the centre point of the Śrī Kalyāṇī Yogāśrama Sanstha - the first Association of meditation monasteries in Sri Lanka.

Ven. Kadawedduwe Sri Jinavamsa Mahathera himself was ordained at the age of 13, and founded the Thebuvana Granthakara Pirivena (monk school) when he was only 25 and served as head instructor for over 20 years. He started the Yogāśrama Sanstha at the age of 45, and enjoyed a long life of 98 years.

Following the way of the Buddha he strongly believed that all the riches of life meant nothing without vimukti (vimutti, "freedom" or "deliverance") which he understood was the goal of Buddhist meditation and the reason d'etre for Buddhist monks. Consequently, he left all his students except for one, Ven.Gatamanne Vimalavamsa Thera, who accompanied him in his quest for a fitting dwelling for deep meditation. The support rendered by Ven. Gatamanne Vimalavamsa Thera and Matara Sri Nanarama Mahathera in this quest, was immense.

Foundation 

To commemorate the 2500th birthday of the Buddha Buddha Jayanti Ven. Kadawedduwe Sri Jinawansa Thera founded the Śrī Kalyāṇī Yogāśrama Sanstha on 18 June 1951. Nimalawa Aranya Senasanaya in Kirinda was selected as the first aranya or hermitage of a number of aranya senasana which were all connected into an association named Śrī Kalyāṇī Yogāśrama Sanstha. With the passage of time the fame of Kalyani Yogashrama grew. People in many walks of life flowed into the Aranya in search of the authentic way of meditation.

But setting up the Śrī Kalyāṇī Yogāśrama Sanstha was no easy task. Although most lay persons were attracted to Ven. Kadawedduwe Sri Jinawansa Theras extremely eloquent sermons, there were people, the lay and monks alike who resented and envied his success. But thanks to his conviction the Kalyani Yogasrama Sanstha now has over 150 Aranya with over 1500 monks.

After the establishment of Sri Kalyani Yogasrama Sanstha, the founder Kadawedduwe Sri Jinavamsa Mahathera was in need of finding a qualified senior bhikkhu as the Leader of the group. Then he had to invite Matara Sri Nanarama Mahathera several times and fortunately got the invitation accepted at last. Until 1992, the great meditation master Matara Sri Nanarama Mahathera was the Maha Upajjhaya (chief mentor) of the Yogāśrama Sanstha.

Famous Monasteries 

Currently Śrī Kalyāṇī Yogāśrama Sanstha has expanded in Sri Lanka with notable forest hermitages like Meethirigala Nissarana Vanaya (Where the first Maha Upajjhaya Matara Nanarama Maha Thero resided in), Na Uyana Aranya, Nimalawa Aranya (the first monastery), Kurunegala Nathagane Aranya, Buttala Budu Gallena Aranya, Koggala Aranya, Minneriya Mahasen Aranya, Kudumbigala Aranya, Kurunegala Ruwangirikanda Aranya, Padaviya Galpiyuma Aranya, etc. However, Ambalangoda Galduva Aranya acts as the center monastery which facilitates for ordination ceremonies.

Chief Mentors 
 Matara Nanarama Mahathera - The first Chief Mentor (Maha Upajjhaya) of Śrī Kalyāṇī Yogāśrama Sanstha
 Kadawedduwe Jinavamsa Mahathera - The Founding Father and second Chief Mentor of Śrī Kalyāṇī Yogāśrama Sanstha
 Mawatagama Gunananda Mahathera - Third Chief Mentor of Śrī Kalyāṇī Yogāśrama Sanstha
 Na Uyane Ariyadhamma Mahathera - Fourth Chief Mentor of Śrī Kalyāṇī Yogāśrama Sanstha
 Pahalavitiyala Janananda Thero - Fifth(Current) Chief Mentor of Śrī Kalyāṇī Yogāśrama Sanstha

Other Notable Monks 
 Gatamanne Vimalavansa Mahathera  - Late abbot of Natagane Forest Monastery
 Asmandale Ratanapala Mahathera - A revolutionary monk who strictly refused the monks who are using money
 Madawala Dhamamatilaka Mahathera - Late abbot of Nimalawa Forest Monastery
 Matale Silarakkhita Mahathera  - Late abbot of Ruwangirikanda Forest Monastery

See also 
 Sri Lankan Forest Tradition
 Rāmañña Nikāya
 Amarapura–Rāmañña Nikāya

References

External links 
 Most Venerable Matara Sri Nanarama Maha Thero

Theravada Buddhist orders
Schools of Buddhism founded in Sri Lanka